Pachhai Vilakku is a 1964 Indian Tamil-language drama film, directed by A. Bhimsingh and produced by Rama. Arangannal, A. R. Hassan Khan and T. S. Aadhi Narayanan. The film stars Sivaji Ganesan, C. R. Vijayakumari, S. S. Rajendran and S. V. Ranga Rao. It was released on 3 April 1964, and become a box-office success, running for over 100 days in theaters.

Plot

Cast 
Sivaji Ganesan as Sarathy
Sowcar Janaki as Parvathi
S. S. Rajendran as Pasupathy
C. R. Vijayakumari as Sumathi
A. V. M. Rajan as Mani
Pushpalatha as Latha
S. V. Ranga Rao as Ponnambalam
M. R. Radha as Rajabaadhar
Nagesh as Joseph
V. Nagayya as Gopalaiya
S. R. Janaki as Annammal
K. K. Soundar as Balu's henchman
Sriram as Balu
Karuppu Subbiah as Karim

Production 
Saravanan who was doing a film on engine driver was on search of suitable title while crossing railway gate at T. Nagar. He stuck posters with green light as main feature in a wall near the railway gate which led Bhimsingh to name his film as Pachhai Vilakku. The film was initially shot in 8000 ft which left Meiyappan unimpressed and decided to reshoot with different story on the same backdrop with the additional cast involving Rajan and Pushpalatha.

Soundtrack 
The music was composed by Viswanathan–Ramamoorthy and lyrics for the songs were written by Kannadasan. The songs "Olimayamaana Ethirkaalam" and "Kelvi Pirandhadhu" attained popularity.

Release and reception 
Pachhai Vilakku was released on 3 April 1964. The Indian Express called it "a frothy, headlong musical melodrama, designed only to entertain." The film ran for over 100 days in theatres.

References

Bibliography

External links 
 

1960s Tamil-language films
1964 films
Films directed by A. Bhimsingh
Films scored by Viswanathan–Ramamoorthy
Indian drama films
1964 drama films